Salle Gaston Médecin, or Salle Omnisports, is an indoor sports arena located in the Fontvieille district, within the Principality of Monaco. It is used to host basketball, volleyball, and handball games, judo and fencing matches, and weightlifting and gymnastics competitions. The arena is a part of the Stade Louis II multi-sports complex, and is owned by the Monaco-based multi-sports club AS Monaco.

The capacity had been expanded to 4,090 seats in 2021 in order to be eligible to host Euroleague basketball games, and then further increased to 4,600 seats before the 2022 season.

History
The arena was originally opened in 1985 with the presence of Prince Rainier III, Was named after Gaston Medécin, a Monegasque athlete who died in 1983. The space was subject to a renovation process between 2014 and 2015 and expanded in 2016, 2021, and 2022.

References

External links
Stade Louis II Official Website - Salle Omnisports 
Image of the interior of Salle Gaston Médecin

AS Monaco FC
1985 establishments in Monaco
Basketball venues in Monaco
Fontvieille, Monaco
Handball venues in Monaco
Indoor arenas in Monaco
National stadiums
Sports venues completed in 1985
Sports venues in Monaco
Volleyball venues in Monaco